Andrija Hebrang (22 October 1899 – 11 June 1949) was a Croatian and Yugoslav communist revolutionary and politician. A member of the Communist Party of Yugoslavia until his dismissal, he served as the 4th Secretary of the Central Committee of the Communist Party of Croatia.

Early life
Andrija Hebrang was born in Bačevac (part of Gradina) to Andrija Hebrang and Cela Strasser. In World War I, he was stationed in Osijek, Zagreb, and finally the battlefields in Gorizia, Italy where he stayed until the end of the war. Not long afterward, in 1919, he joined the Communist Party of Yugoslavia and became heavily involved in socialist political causes.

Political involvement
He became a member of the Socialist Workers' Party of Yugoslavia (communists) in 1919 in Osijek, distinguished himself and was a member of the Local Committee of the CPY for Zagreb. In 1920, the Yugoslav government banned Obzan from the Communist Party. However, the unresolved Croatian issue was far more dangerous for the government than the communist activity. At the beginning of 1923, the communists illegally founded the Independent Workers' Party of Yugoslavia. In the same year, Hebrang settled in Zagreb. [10] He was first arrested for street demonstrations in March 1924, after which he spent several days in prison. In the 1925 elections, the Independent Workers' Party won only 1.1% of the vote and was left without a seat in the National Assembly. The following year, Hebrang joined the Board of Directors of a branch of the Union of Private Employees as treasurer, and before their congress in October 1927 he was expelled from the union and administration. In 1928, Pantovčak was presided over by VIII. conference of the Zagreb Communists where, together with Tito, he opposed factional struggles within the Party. The victory of their anti-factional current, with the support of Antun Mavrak, secretary of the CPY Provincial Committee for Croatia and Slavonia, enabled the consolidation of party ranks. 

Hebrang was appointed an envoy of the Zagreb Local Committee at the April session of the Comintern in Moscow, but was arrested on April 13, 1928, while crossing the border. He was detained for three months for "wandering and communism," [12] but was soon released for lack of evidence. He was expelled to Bačevac, but returned illegally to Zagreb, where, after the murder of Pavle Radić and Đuro Basaričko, the wounding of Ivan Pernar and Ivan Granđa, and the fatal wounding of Stjepan Radić in the National Assembly on June 20, 1928, the work of the Party intensified. Following the assassinations, the ensuing protests intensified police persecution of opponents of the regime, especially HSS members and communists.

Imprisonment (1928–1941)
In Zagreb, meanwhile, the management of the Workers' Cultural Society, of which Hebrang was a member, was arrested and served a month in prison. At the same time, he was expelled to Bačevac for five years, but as soon as the circumstances allowed, he returned illegally to Zagreb. Hebrang was arrested again on September 7, 1928, together with Mihail Vraneš, in Zagreb, in front of the house in Gundulićeva Street, where the secret Party archives were located. Because he was arrested with compromising letters and documents, he was taken to remand prison. At that time, communism, under the State Protection Act, was characterized as a coup d'état, which made it impossible to punish Hebrang more leniently.  At the trial in Belgrade, he did not admit his affiliation with the Communist Party, but declared himself a communist by conviction. As his communist activity was indisputably proven, the State Court for the Protection of the State sentenced him, on November 13, 1928, to 12 years in prison. He was sent to serve his sentence in Lepoglava, but at the end of 1933, together with other political prisoners, communists, he was transferred to Srijemska Mitrovica, because after the strike in Lepoglava the penitentiary administration decided to gather political prisoners in one place.

World War II
In 1942, he was captured by the Ustaše in house of Ivan Srebrenjak and sent to Stara Gradiška concentration camp, where he was later exchanged along with his future wife, Olga, for several Ustasha officials. He traveled to Bihać to attend the Anti-fascist Council of the National Liberation of Yugoslavia (AVNOJ). He also helped form the State Antifascist Council of the National Liberation of Croatia (ZAVNOH) and served as the vice-president. On 20 September 1943, ZAVNOH unilaterally issued a declaration that Istria, Rijeka, and Italian-occupied Dalmatia were part of Croatia without the prior approval of the national AVNOJ. which angered Yugoslav leader Tito.

At the third session of ZAVNOH, held on 8–9 May in Topusko several resolutions were adopted which further angered Broz. They included an openness to continue religious education in schools and overtures to a free press. In September 1944, the Executive Board of ZAVNOH established the Telegraphic Agency of Croatia (TAH). Broz immediately sent a telegram to Hebrang on 17 September:

Immediately stop with the work of this so-called telegraph agency - TAH. What does this even mean? You're sliding with full force into separatism. Don't you realize that even federal states have a single telegraph agency. Let your example be the Soviet Union if no other.

The following day Broz also sent a telegram to Edvard Kardelj:
Urgently travel to Croatia. They're creating some unbelievable idiocy. First, ZAVNOH adopted a resolution according to which religious education is a mandatory subject in schools. Second, they've founded some telegraph agency - TAH. This all demonstrates that separatist tendencies are fairly strong and this is true of our comrades. With this there is no kidding, for we will have to undertake the sharpest measures. For all this I blame Andrija. Make inquiries and if Andrija is not of this opinion, we will have to immediately remove him from the post of secretary of the CC [Central Committee].

After World War II

Industrialization

Five-Year Plan

Industrialization was the most significant process in the economic development of the SR Croatia, as communists promoted industrialization as the main factor in fast development. After the process of renewal, the process of industrialization and electrification started based on the Soviet model. The whole economy, the creation of a system and the formulation of the strategy of development in the Five-Year Plan, was in the charge of Andrija Hebrang. As President of the Economy Council and President of the Planning Commission, Hebrang was in charge of all ministries that dealt with the economy. Alongside Tito, Edvard Kardelj and Aleksandar Ranković, he was the most influential person in Yugoslavia. As a chief of the whole economy, Hebrang finished his Five-Year Plan in winter 1946–47 which was approved by the government in spring 1947. Because of the lack of knowledge, the Plan copied the Soviet model. The factories which were built faster were factories that were in the sector of heavy and military industry, of which the most known in SR Croatia were "Rade Končar" and "Prvomajska".

In the Five-Year Plan, Hebrang wanted to increase the industrial production by five times and agricultural production by 1.5 times, increase the GDP per capita by 1.8 times and the national revenues by 1.8 times. The plan also included the increase of qualified workers, from 350,000 to 750,000. For the SR Croatia, it was decided that its industrial production needed to be increased by 452%. The fast development in industry required a high number of workers, so from 461,000 workers in 1945, in 1949 there were 1,990,000 workers. On 17 January 1947, Kardelj stated to the Central Committee of the Communist Party of Croatia that Yugoslavia would be industrially stronger than Austria and Czechoslovakia. Both Kardelj and Bakarić advocated development of light industry, instead of Hebrang's idea for industry that would serve agriculture.

Attitude towards Serbs during the war
Hebrang always emphasized the fraternal struggle of the Croatian and Serbian people for their Croatian homeland, in October 1943 in Plaški: Serbs in Croatia, who shed their blood and made great sacrifices, also showed great love for their Croatian homeland. It would be a crime against the Serbian people, against their victims, if one only thought of denying the Serbs the same rights that Croats will have. Serbs in Croatia deserved to be completely free and equal with Croats. At Hebrang's suggestion, ZAVNOH in 1944 decided that both alphabets - Latin and Cyrillic - would become equal.  In March 1944, Moša Pijade decided to abuse the voluntarily granted equality by drafting a proposal for the territorial autonomy of the Serbs in Croatia. When he made maps of Serbian autonomy, they looked like "twisted pipes" according to Djilas, and in order to include Serbs in Slavonia, he "had to" take away numerous Croatian settlements from Croats. Politburo members welcomed Pijadin's proposal in "silence and doubt", and Tito was somewhat gloomy

Later years and death
Around the beginning of the Tito–Stalin Split in 1948, Hebrang was suspected of being Stalin's prime candidate for replacing Tito. Hebrang was thus blacklisted from the Yugoslav Communist Party and expelled. By March his phones were tapped, and in April he was placed under house arrest, relieved of all official duties. In May, he was accused of collaborating with the Ustashe and the Gestapo to sabotage Yugoslavia and spy for the Soviets after Tito broke with Joseph Stalin.

Hebrang was arrested in Belgrade by UDBA agents and accused of numerous treasons, while his wife and small children were put under house arrest. He disappeared under suspicious circumstances. UDBA official Milorad Milatović, who was in charge of the Hebrang case, claimed in 1952 that Hebrang had committed suicide at Glavnjača prison in Belgrade on 11 June 1949, but his body was never recovered and no official death certificate was filed. In the late 1980s, several historians reported that Hebrang had been assassinated in his Belgrade prison cell for political reasons.

Afterwards

Not long after Hebrang's arrest, his wife Olga was sentenced to twelve years in prison, and his children were sent to live with his sister, Ilona, in Zagreb. His family changed their surname as the government blacklisted anyone with the surname Hebrang. In 1992, the government of the Republic of Croatia rehabilitated Hebrang as a "victim of communism". His sons Andrija and Branko were active in the efforts to rehabilitate their father and return his remains.

Legacy
A street in central Zagreb, Ulica Andrije Hebranga, is named for Hebrang.

See also
Andrija Hebrang (son)
UDBA

References

Sources
 

1899 births
1949 deaths
People from Gradina, Virovitica-Podravina County
People from the Kingdom of Croatia-Slavonia
Croatian Austro-Hungarians
Croatian communists
Yugoslav communists
Stalinism
Anti-revisionists
Croatian people of World War I
League of Communists of Croatia politicians
Yugoslav Partisans members
Yugoslav soldiers
Assassinated Croatian politicians
Assassinated Yugoslav people
People murdered in Serbia
Date of death unknown
1949 murders in Europe